The tiny toadlet (Uperoleia micra) is a species of small frog that is endemic to Australia. The specific epithet micra refers to its small size.

Description
The species grows to about 20 mm in length (SVL). The upper body is brown with dark spots. The sides of body and head are bluish-grey. The belly is white, speckled grey. The fingers unwebbed, toes partly webbed. The backs of the thighs and groin are orange-red.

Behaviour
Breeding takes place in summer and autumn in the wet season.

Distribution and habitat
The species’ known range is limited to the north-west Kimberley region of Western Australia in the tropical north-west of the continent. The area is characterised by rugged sandstone topography and high seasonal rainfall.

References

 
Uperoleia
Amphibians of Western Australia
Amphibians described in 2008
Frogs of Australia